The Popular Movement in Iraq or the Sunni Popular Movement, or just Popular Movement, or Hirak is a Sunni political movement in Iraq. The spokesperson for the movement is Sheikh Mohammed Taha al-Hamdoun.

Founding
The movement was founded in Samarra at the end of 2011 by the Islamic Army in Iraq, which demobilized following the US withdrawal from Iraq. The IAI had been largely weakened by individuals leaving the group and instead joining the various Sahwa militias. The groups turn away from armed opposition towards activism was criticised by other militant groups, such as Jaysh al-Mujihadeen.

Activity
The movement was involved in the 2012–14 Iraqi protests, particularly in Fallujah, which was also the focus of groups such as al-Qaeda and the Ba'athist Free Iraq Intifada.

The movement is opposed to the government of Nouri al-Maliki, and fighters aligned with the movement have been active in the 2014 Northern Iraq offensive. The movement accuses the government of Nouri al-Maliki of oppressing Sunni's and aims to topple Maliki's government and replace it with a unity government. The movement has also called for a decentralized Iraq with autonomous Sunni regions. The group has also called for Sunni lawmakers to boycott a 1 July 2014 parliamentary meeting to elect a new President and Government of Iraq.

The movement is opposed to ISIS and claims that whilst ISIS has international ambitions, the Popular Movement desires only to defend the rights of Sunni's in Iraq. Hamdoun, the movement's spokesperson, has instead claimed that ISIS only constitutes 3,000 foreign fighters, or 10% of the total number of fighters opposing the Iraqi government, and is incapable of controlling Northern Iraq by itself. Hamdoun has also claimed that they will fight ISIS after the fall of the Maliki government.

References

2011 establishments in Iraq
Federalist parties
Iraqi nationalism
Islamic political parties in Iraq
Nationalist parties in Iraq
Political parties established in 2011
Sunni Islamic political parties